This is a list of diplomatic missions in Kyrgyzstan.  At present, the capital of Bishkek hosts 23 embassies.  Several other countries have ambassadors accredited from other regional capitals, such as Almaty/Astana, Moscow and Tashkent.(not including honorary consulates).

Embassies

Bishkek

Other Posts
 (Representative Office)
 (Delegation)

Consulates-General/Consulates

Osh 
 (Consulate)

Non-Resident Embassies

Former embassies

Notes

References
Kyrgyzstan Diplomatic List (In Russian)

Diplomatic missions in Kyrgyzstan
Diplomatic missions
Kyrgyzstan